Belinda Schönberger (27 August 1991) is an Austrian former competitive figure skater. She is the 2011 Austrian national champion and has won two senior international medals.

Programs

Competitive highlights
CS: Challenger Series; JGP: Junior Grand Prix

References

External links 

 

Austrian female single skaters
1991 births
Living people
Figure skaters from Vienna
Competitors at the 2017 Winter Universiade